Annapolis Farewell is a 1935 American drama film directed by Alexander Hall and written by Frank Craven and Jack Wagner. The film stars Guy Standing, Rosalind Keith, Tom Brown, Richard Cromwell, John Howard and Benny Baker. The film was released on August 23, 1935, by Paramount Pictures.

Plot

Cast 
Guy Standing as Cmdr. Fitzhugh
Rosalind Keith as Madeline Deming
Tom Brown as Morton 'Click' Haley
Richard Cromwell as Boyce Avery
John Howard as Duncan Haley
Benny Baker as Zimmer
Louise Beavers as Miranda
Minor Watson as Cmmdre. Briggs
Ben Alexander as Adams
John Darrow as Porter
William Collier Sr. as Rumboat Charlie
Wheeler Oakman as Cmdr. Lawson
Samuel S. Hinds as Dr. Bryant

Reception
Frank Nugent of The New York Times said, "Filmed at Annapolis with—as the announcement proclaims — the "cheerful cooperation" of the academy, the photoplay's backgrounds are colorful. Besides Sir Guy, the other members of the cast are insignificant, but there are good performances by Tom Brown as the impudent middy, by John Howard (a comparative newcomer) as his elder brother, and Louise Beavers as Commander Fitzhugh's housekeeper. A complete summary would be that the film is extremely sentimental, familiar in pattern but exceedingly well-made for all that."

References

External links 
 

1935 films
American black-and-white films
Paramount Pictures films
American drama films
1935 drama films
Films directed by Alexander Hall
1930s English-language films
1930s American films